

Al Ahly

Manager:  Hossam El-Badry

Auckland City

Manager:  Ramon Tribulietx

Chelsea

Manager:  Rafael Benítez

Monterrey

Manager:  Víctor Manuel Vucetich

Corinthians

Manager:  Tite

Sanfrecce Hiroshima

Manager:  Hajime Moriyasu

Ulsan Hyundai

Manager:  Kim Ho-kon

References

External links
FIFA Club World Cup Japan 2012 Official List of Players

Squads
FIFA Club World Cup squads